William Adamson School is a historic school building located in the West Kensington neighborhood of Philadelphia, Pennsylvania.  It was designed by Addison Hutton and built in 1879–1880.  It is a three-story, four bay, brick building on a stone basement in the Queen Anne-style. The two central bays are slightly projecting. It features brownstone sills and lintels and brick piers with brownstone tops.

It was added to the National Register of Historic Places in 1988.

References

School buildings on the National Register of Historic Places in Philadelphia
Queen Anne architecture in Pennsylvania
School buildings completed in 1880
Upper North Philadelphia